Minami Niikura (born 2 March 1998) is a Japanese swimmer. She represented Japan at the 2017 World Aquatics Championships in Budapest, Hungary and at the 2019 World Aquatics Championships in Gwangju, South Korea. In 2019, she competed in the women's 10 km event and she finished in 30th place.

She also competed in the women's 10 kilometre marathon at the 2017 Summer Universiade held in Taipei, Taiwan.

References 

Living people
1998 births
Place of birth missing (living people)
Japanese female long-distance swimmers
Competitors at the 2017 Summer Universiade